Luka Lochoshvili (born 29 May 1998) is a Georgian professional footballer who plays as a centre-back for  club Cremonese.

Club career
Luka Lochoshvili initially played in Dinamo Tbilisi youth teams before his promotion to the first team in 2016. He made a debut in a 4–0 win against Lokomotive Tbilisi on 18 November 2016.

The next summer Lochoshvili signed a five-year deal with Dinamo Kyiv, although in March 2018 was loaned back to his boyhood club  and later, in February 2019, to Slovak side Zilina.

Lochoshvili made his professional Fortuna Liga debut for Žilina against DAC Dunajská Streda on 6 April 2019.

In early 2020 Dinamo Kyiv and Luka Lochoshvili terminated the existing contract. The player spent next several months at Dinamo Tbilisi and moved to Wolfsberger AC. He opened his goal account in a 5–3 away win against Austria Wien on 21 March 2021.

In February 2022, while playing for Wolfsberger AC against Austria in Vienna, Lochoshvili took out the tongue of  Austria player Georg Teigl. Teigl collided with an opposition player and was lying unconscious, unable to breathe, as he had swallowed his own tongue. Shortly afterwards Luka Lochoshvili was awarded with the Dignity Cross by the grateful Carinthia state governor. He won the Fair Play award in The Best FIFA Football Awards 2022 for his actions.

On 10 August 2022, Lochoshvili signed with Cremonese in Italy. He made a first appearance for his new club against A.S.Roma on 22 August.

International career
Lochoshvili made his debut for the Georgia national football team on 5 September 2021 in a World Cup qualifier against Spain, a 4–0 away loss. He started the game and played the whole match.

Honours
Individual
 Best young player of Georgia (2020)
 FIFA Fair Play Award: 2022

References

External links
 
 Futbalnet profile
 

1998 births
Living people
Footballers from Tbilisi
Footballers from Georgia (country)
Association football defenders
Georgia (country) international footballers
Georgia (country) under-21 international footballers
Georgia (country) youth international footballers
Erovnuli Liga players
Slovak Super Liga players
2. Liga (Slovakia) players
Austrian Football Bundesliga players
FC Dinamo Tbilisi players
FC Dynamo Kyiv players
MŠK Žilina players
Wolfsberger AC players
U.S. Cremonese players
Expatriate footballers from Georgia (country)
Expatriate footballers in Ukraine
Expatriate footballers in Slovakia
Expatriate footballers in Austria
Expatriate footballers in Italy
Expatriate sportspeople from Georgia (country) in Ukraine
Expatriate sportspeople from Georgia (country) in Slovakia
Expatriate sportspeople from Georgia (country) in Austria
Expatriate sportspeople from Georgia (country) in Italy